Tyson Lomano David Frizell (born 9 October 1991) is a professional rugby league footballer who usually plays as a er for the Newcastle Knights in the NRL. He has played for Wales in the 2011 Four Nations and 2013 Rugby League World Cup and Australia at international level.

He previously played for the Cronulla-Sutherland Sharks and St. George Illawarra Dragons in the National Rugby League. He has also represented NSW Country Origin, New South Wales in the State of Origin series and the Prime Minister's XIII.

Background
Frizell was born in Wollongong, New South Wales, Australia to a Welsh father and Tongan mother. Tyson's adoptive brother Shannon is a rugby union player for the Highlanders in Super Rugby and the All Blacks internationally.

Playing career

2009
He played his junior rugby league with the Corrimal Cougars, while also playing his junior rugby union with the Woonona Shamrocks club. Frizell attended the Illawarra Sports High School in Wollongong on the NSW South Coast. In 2009 he was selected as a centre for the Australian Rugby Union Schoolboys Tour of the United Kingdom and Ireland.

2010 & 2011
Shortly after returning from the tour, Frizell announced that he would be joining the Cronulla-Sutherland Sharks NYC squad for the 2010 season. In the 2010/11 season Frizell played 42 NYC games with the Sharks. While in his second NYC year, Frizell made his NRL début for the Cronulla-Sutherland Sharks on 29 July 2011 against the Brisbane Broncos at Suncorp Stadium, following up with a second NRL appearance in 2011 against the Sydney Roosters. At the conclusion of the 2011 season, Frizell joined the Welsh Rugby League team, and played two tests in the Gillette Four Nations Series.

In his first full NRL season in 2012, Frizell played 10 games for Cronulla but despite some good performances, failed to hold down a regular back-row spot in the starting 17.

2012 & 2013
On 12 April 2012, Frizell announced he would joining the St. George Illawarra Dragons on a two-year deal beginning November 2012.
His debut for the club occurred on 10 March 2013 against the Melbourne Storm at AAMI Park, Melbourne. In the 2013 season Frizell played 22 games for St. George and was credited as being one of the few shining lights in a team that endured a very poor season.

At the conclusion of the 2013 NRL season, Frizell re-joined the Welsh team and played another 3 tests in the 2013 Rugby League World Cup held in the United Kingdom.

Upon returning from World Cup duties, St. George Illawarra announced on 11 December 2013 that Frizell had re-signed with the club at least until the end of the 2017 season.

2016
Frizell enjoyed a breakout season in 2016 earning both a State of Origin début and an Australian début.

2017
Frizell was selected in the Australian side for the 2017 rugby league world cup.  Frizell came off the bench in Australia's 6–0 victory over England in the final.

2018
In 2018, Frizell was selected to play for New South Wales in the 2018 State of Origin series.  Frizell played in all three games as The Blues won the series 2–1.
Frizell was part of the St George side which qualified for the finals in 2018.  In week one, St George upset Brisbane at Suncorp Stadium winning the match 48–18.  The following week, St George were eliminated from the finals series losing 13–12 to South Sydney.

2019
In Round 1 2019, Frizell suffered a freak injury in St George's defeat against the North Queensland Cowboys.  Frizell had attempted to tackle North Queensland player Jordan Kahu but suffered a ruptured testicle after being hit in the groin by accident.  Frizell later underwent surgery and was ruled out for 4–6 weeks.

Frizell was selected to play in the 2019 State of Origin series and featured in all 3 matches as New South Wales won the series 2–1.  It was the first time since 2005 that New South Wales had won back to back series.

Frizell made a total of 21 appearances for St. George in the 2019 NRL season as the club endured one of their worst ever seasons finishing in 15th place just above the last placed Gold Coast.

On 30 September 2019, Frizell was named at second row in the Australia PM XIII side. On 7 October, Frizell was named in the Australian side for the 2019 Rugby League World Cup 9s and the upcoming Oceania Cup fixtures.

2020
In March 2020, it was revealed that Frizell had accepted a three-year contract with the Newcastle Knights starting in 2021, however the contract wasn't immediately registered by the NRL due to the ongoing uncertainty around the competition during the COVID-19 pandemic.

Frizell made a total of 20 appearances for St. George in the 2020 NRL season, in his final game for the club he scored two tries during their 30–22 victory over Melbourne at Kogarah Oval.

2021
Frizell played 19 games for Newcastle in the 2021 NRL season including the club's elimination finals loss against Parramatta.

2022
Frizell played 21 games for Newcastle in the 2022 NRL season scoring three tries as the club missed the finals finishing 14th on the table.

References

External links

Newcastle Knights profile
St. George Illawarra Dragons profile
Dragons profile at dragons.com.au
(archived by web.archive.org) Statistics at rlwc2017.com

1991 births
Living people
Australia national rugby league team players
Australian sportspeople of Tongan descent
Australian people of Welsh descent
Australian rugby league players
Country New South Wales Origin rugby league team players
Cronulla-Sutherland Sharks players
New South Wales Rugby League State of Origin players
Newcastle Knights players
Newcastle Knights captains
Rugby league locks
Rugby league players from Wollongong
Rugby league second-rows
St. George Illawarra Dragons players
Wales national rugby league team players